Michel Pastre (born April 7, 1966) is a French jazz tenor saxophonist.

Career 
After trying the drums and the alto saxophone he finally turns to the tenor saxophone. From 1991 to 1998, he is one of big bands Banana Jazz and Tuxedo Big Band. In 1995 he joined the Super swing machine of Gérard Badini and 1997 with trumpeter Alain Bouchet he started a quintet. In 1999 he performed with Al Casey (Fats Waller's guitarist). In 2000 he founded his own band the Michel Pastre Big band with which he performed in jazz.

Discography

References 
 The New Grove Dictionary of Jazz

Living people
1966 births
Jazz saxophonists
21st-century saxophonists